Eugene "Gene" Honda is a public address announcer for the Chicago White Sox (starting in 1985, full-time since 1991), Chicago Blackhawks (succeeding Harvey Wittenberg since the 2001–02 season), DePaul Blue Demons basketball, Big Ten tournament, Illinois Fighting Illini football (since 2012), and the NCAA Final Four (since 2010). He is also a constant voice on Chicago's PBS station WTTW Channel 11, the Big Ten Network, and the Chicago Marathon. He formerly worked for radio station WLAK (now WLIT) in Chicago. Honda was the PA announcer for the 2009 NHL Winter Classic on January 1 at Wrigley Field. Additionally, he was the PA announcer for the 2012 Frozen Four at the Tampa Bay Times Forum.

Honda is the only person to have announced at the MLB World Series, MLB All Star Game, NHL Stanley Cup Playoffs, NCAA Final Four, NCAA Frozen Four, a World Marathon Major,the STIHL Strong Man competition and the Westminster Dog Show.

Gene graduated from Chicago's Senn High School in 1972.

Honda attended the University of Illinois, graduating in 1978. He is a member of Triangle Fraternity.

Honda appeared briefly in the 1990 film Opportunity Knocks as Mr. Nimoku.

Gene Honda also is a teacher for the After School Matters (ASM) Sports Broadcasting program at Curie High School for the past 10 years.

On October 11, 2008, Honda was inducted into the Illini Media Alumni Hall of Fame. 2008 Illini Media Hall of Fame inductees

Honda had his own talking bobble head. He is shown sitting at a desk with a microphone in front of him. A part of the proceeds from sales of the item are donated to media education programs at his alma mater, the University of Illinois.

References

Chicago Blackhawks personnel
Chicago White Sox personnel
Major League Baseball public address announcers
DePaul University people
National Hockey League public address announcers
Living people
American people of Japanese descent
University of Illinois Urbana-Champaign alumni
Year of birth missing (living people)